Polygona bernadensis is a species of sea snail, a marine gastropod mollusk in the family Fasciolariidae, the spindle snails, the tulip snails and their allies.

Description

Distribution
This marine species occurs off Barbados.

References

External links
 Bullock R.C. (1974). A contribution to the systematics of some West Indian Latirus (Gastropoda: Fasciolariidae). The Nautilus. 88(3): 69–79
 Vermeij, G. J. & Snyder, M. A. (2006). Shell characters and taxonomy of Latirus and related fasciolariid groups. Journal of Molluscan Studies. 72(4): 413–424
 Lyons W.G. & Snyder M.A. (2019). Fasciolariidae (Gastropoda: Neogastropoda) of French Guiana and nearby regions, with descriptions of two new species and comments on marine zoogeography of northeastern South America. Zootaxa. 4585(2): 239–268

Fasciolariidae
Gastropods described in 1947